Cordioniscus stebbingi is a species of woodlouse in the family Trichoniscidae. It is found in Europe and Northern Asia (excluding China) and North America.

Subspecies
These two subspecies belong to the species Cordioniscus stebbingi:
 Cordioniscus stebbingi boettgeri Verhoeff, 1929
 Cordioniscus stebbingi stebbingi

References

Isopoda
Articles created by Qbugbot
Crustaceans described in 1907